Inga calanthoides is a species of plant in the family Fabaceae. It is found only in Suriname.

References

calanthoides
Flora of Suriname
Vulnerable plants
Taxonomy articles created by Polbot